During the 2017–18 season Vitesse participated in the Dutch Eredivisie, KNVB Cup, Johan Cruyff Shield and the UEFA Europa League.

Players

Squad details

Transfers

In

Total spending: €4.2M

Out

Total gaining: €21.6M 

Balance
Total:  €17.4M

Pre-season
Following the conclusion of the 2016–17 campaign, Vitesse announced they would play Oostende, Sparta Prague and Reading in July 2017.

Competitions

Overview

{| class="wikitable" style="text-align: center"
|-
!rowspan=2|Competition
!colspan=8|Record
|-
!
!
!
!
!
!
!
!
|-
| Eredivisie

|-
| European play-offs

|-
| KNVB Cup

|-
| Johan Cruyff Shield

|-
| UEFA Europa League

|-
! Total

Johan Cruyff Shield

Eredivisie

League table

Results summary

Results by matchday

Matches

The fixtures for the 2017–18 season were announced in June 2017.

European play-offs
Four teams will play for a spot in the 2018–19 UEFA Europa League second qualifying round.

Semi-finals

Final

KNVB Cup

UEFA Europa League

Vitesse qualified for the Group Stage of the 2017–18 UEFA Europa League by winning the 2016–17 KNVB Cup.

Group stage

Statistics

Appearances

Top scorers
The list is sorted by shirt number when total goals are equal.

Clean sheets
The list is sorted by shirt number when total appearances are equal.

Summary

References

External links
Vitesse Official Website 

Dutch football clubs 2017–18 season
SBV Vitesse seasons